The Flatiron Institute is an American internal research division of the Simons Foundation, launched in 2016. It comprises five centers for computational science: the Center for Computational Astrophysics (CCA); the Center for Computational Biology (CCB); the Center for Computational Quantum Physics (CCQ); the Center for Computational Mathematics (CCM); and the Center for Computational Neuroscience (CCN). It also has a group called the Scientific Computing Core (SCC). The institute takes its name from the Flatiron District in New York City where it's based.

The mission of the Flatiron Institute is to advance scientific research through computational methods, including data analysis, theory, modeling, and simulation. The Flatiron Institute was dedicated with a ceremony on September 6, 2017.

Center for Computational Biology 
 Launched in 2013 as the Simons Center for Data Analysis
 Director: Michael Shelley
 Mission: CCB's mission is to develop modeling tools and theory for understanding biological processes and to create computational frameworks that will enable the analysis of the large, complex data sets being generated by new experimental technologies.
 Research groups: Biophysical Modeling, Developmental Dynamics, Genomics, Structural and Molecular Biophysics, Systems Biology

Center for Computational Astrophysics 
 Launched in 2016
 Director: Julianne Dalcanton
 Mission: CCA's mission is to create new computational frameworks that allow scientists to analyze big astronomical datasets and to understand complex, multi-scale physics in a cosmological context.
 Research groups: Astronomical Data, Compact Objects, Cosmology X Data Science, Dynamics, Galaxy Formation, Gravitational-Wave Astronomy, Planet Formation

Center for Computational Quantum Physics 
 Launched in 2017
 Director: Antoine Georges; co-director: Andrew Millis
 Mission: CCQ's mission is to develop the concepts, theories, algorithms and codes needed to solve the quantum many-body problem and use the solutions to predict the behavior of materials and molecules of scientific and technological interest.

Center for Computational Mathematics 
 Launched in 2018
 Director: Leslie Greengard
 Mission: CCM’s mission is to create new mathematical approaches, algorithms and software to advance scientific research in multiple disciplines, often in collaboration with other Flatiron Centers.
 Research groups: Image and Signal Processing, Machine Learning and Data Analysis, Numerical Analysis

Center for Computational Neuroscience 
 Launched in 2021
 Director: Eero Simoncelli
 Mission: CCN’s mission is to develop models, principles and conceptual frameworks that deepen our knowledge of brain function — both in health and in disease.
 Research groups: Computational Vision, Neural Circuits and Algorithms

Scientific Computing Core 
 Co-directors: Nick Carriero and Ian Fisk
 Mission: SCC's mission is to develop and deploy the computing infrastructure – including new computational and statistical methods and storage and data handling system support—necessary for carrying out the research missions of CCA, CCB, CCM, CCN and CCQ.

References
Notes

Bibliography

External links
 

Research institutes in New York (state)
Computer science institutes in the United States